Balurghat High School is a higher secondary school for boys situated at the Ward no. 11 of Balurghat Municipality in Dakshin Dinajpur district of West Bengal. Balurghat High School was established in 1907.

References

High schools and secondary schools in West Bengal
Schools in Dakshin Dinajpur district
Educational institutions established in 1907 
1907 establishments in India